Windsor West is a provincial electoral district in Ontario, Canada, represented in the Legislative Assembly of Ontario from 1967 to 1975 since 1999.

The district consists of the part of the city of Windsor lying west and south of a line drawn from the U.S. border southeast along Langlois Avenue, east along Tecumseh Road East, and southeast along Pillette Road to the southern city limit.

Demographics
Average family income: $66,432  (2001) 
Median household income: $44,939 
Unemployment:    9.2% 
Language, mother tongue: English  66%, French 3%, Other 31% 
Religion: Catholic 46%, Protestant 24%, Muslim 6%, Orthodox Christian 4%, Other Christian 4%, Buddhist 1%, No religious affiliation 13%, Other 2%  
Visible minority: Black 4%, Arab 4%, Chinese 4%, South Asian 3%, Southeast Asian 2%, Latin American 1%, Filipino 1%, Others 1%

History

Windsor West was a provincial electoral district that existed from 1967 to 1975. It was represented by Hugh Peacock and Dr. Ted Bounsall, both New Democrats.

In 1996, Premier Mike Harris and the Progressive Conservative government introduced legislation that changed provincial riding boundaries to match federal riding boundaries. This created the new provincial riding of Windsor West. It included parts of Windsor—Sandwich and Windsor—Walkerville.

Members of Provincial Parliament

This riding has elected the following Member of Provincial Parliament:

Election results

		

	

|align="left" colspan=2|Liberal hold  
|align="right"|Swing
|align="right"|  -7.93
|

^ Change is from redistributed result

2007 electoral reform referendum

Sources
Elections Ontario Past Election Results
Map of riding for 2018 election

Politics of Windsor, Ontario
Ontario provincial electoral districts